Curtain Call is an American television anthology series that aired on NBC from June 20, 1952 until September 26, 1952, as the summer replacement for The RCA Victor Show. Fourteen 30-minute episodes were telecast live from Hollywood. Its stories were based upon the works of writers like John Steinbeck, Henry James, F. Scott Fitzgerald, and John Cheever, among others.

Guest stars included Boris Karloff, Richard Kiley, Carol Bruce, Charlton Heston, Jack Palance, Robert Preston, Maureen Stapleton, Miriam Hopkins, and John Forsythe. It was produced by Worthington Miner.

Robert Boyle was the director.

Episodes

References

External links
Curtain Call at CVTA with episode list

Life magazine article about "The Liar" episode of Curtain Call

1950s American anthology television series
1952 American television series debuts
1952 American television series endings
NBC original programming
American live television series
Television shows filmed in Los Angeles